The 2005 Irish Professional Championship was a professional invitational snooker tournament, which took place between 22 and 26 October 2005. The tournament was held at the Spawell Sport & Leisure Complex in Templeogue, and featured twenty-four exclusively Irish and Northern Irish players.

The qualifying round, last-16, quarter-final and semi-final matches were played over the best of nine frames, and the final over the best of seventeen. Joe Swail won the event, beating Ken Doherty 9–7 in the final.

Results

Main draw

Qualifying
Last 24 (Best of 9 frames)

 David Morris 5–0 Mark Allen 
 Martin McCrudden 5–3 Tom Gleeson 
 Robert Murphy 5–1 John Connors 
 Garry Hardiman 5–2 Alex Higgins 
 Colm Gilcreest 5–4 Brendan O'Donoghue 
 Colin Bingham 5–3 Rodney Goggins 
 Robert McCullough 5–3 James Moore 
 Joe Meara 5–1 Nigel Power

Century breaks
142, 129, 114, 102  Joe Swail
124  Ken Doherty
105  Fergal O'Brien

References

Irish Professional Championship
Irish Professional Championship
Irish Professional Championship
Irish Professional Championship